Ripunjaya of Magadha was the last king of Brihadratha dynasty. His minister Pulika killed him and crowned his son Pradyota as the new king.

See also
 Brihadratha
 Magadha
 Pradyota
 Pradyota dynasty

References

Kings of Magadha

8th-century BC births

682 BC deaths

Year of birth unknown